Cavoukian is an Armenian surname. It may refer to:

Ann Cavoukian (born 1952), former Information and Privacy Commissioner for the Canadian province of Ontario
Onnig Cavoukian (born 1945), Canadian-Armenian photographer
Raffi Cavoukian known by the mononym Raffi (born 1948), Canadian singer-lyricist and author of Armenian descent born in Egypt, best known for his children's music